Wimborne is a hamlet in southern Alberta, Canada within Kneehill County.

The hamlet was probably named for Wimborne Minster in East Dorset, England.

Demographics 

Wimborne Days 

An annual event that centers around the heritage of community building. Every year, the town and its community gathers to participate in events such as: lawnmower races, miniature golf, fireworks, BBQ and bouncy castle, along with other festivities. This event occurs on July 1 (a.k.a. Canada Day).

See also 
List of communities in Alberta
List of designated places in Alberta
List of hamlets in Alberta

References 

Designated places in Alberta
Hamlets in Alberta
Kneehill County